The Federal Correctional Institution, Englewood (FCI Englewood) is a low-security United States federal prison for male inmates in Colorado. It is operated by the Federal Bureau of Prisons (BOP), a division of the United States Department of Justice. The facility also has an administrative detention center and an adjacent satellite prison camp for minimum-security offenders.

FCI Englewood is located in unincorporated Jefferson County. The facility is named after the city of Englewood, Colorado, and has a Littleton, Colorado, mailing address, but is not in either city.

FCI Englewood had the worst COVID-19 outbreak in the federal prison system, with more than half of incarcerated people contracting the virus.

Notable incidents  
On April 2, 2012, FCI Englewood was placed on lockdown after a white powdery substance was found inside an envelope addressed to an inmate during a routine mail screening. A hazardous materials team was called to the prison and local and federal law enforcement authorities were notified. The substance was determined to be harmless. The Bureau of Prisons would not identify the inmate to whom the letter was addressed.

On December 21, 2018, the day before the 2018–19 United States federal government shutdown began, prisoner Alan May (14675-111) checked out a vehicle for an alleged work job, and drove off the property without anyone noticing. The government agency responsible for tracking down escaped prisoners was not notified until December 26. , May was still on the run.

Notable inmates

Current

Former

See also 

 List of U.S. federal prisons
 Federal Bureau of Prisons
 Incarceration in the United States

References

External links

 
 Rose, Lacey. "The best places to go to prison", Forbes, May 25, 2006.

Buildings and structures in Jefferson County, Colorado
Federal Correctional Institutions in the United States
Prisons in Colorado
1938 establishments in Colorado